Ken Flach and Robert Seguso successfully defended their title, defeating John Fitzgerald and Anders Järryd in the final, 6–4, 2–6, 6–4, 7–6(7–3) to win the gentlemen's doubles title at the 1988 Wimbledon Championships.

Seeds

  Ken Flach /  Robert Seguso (champions)
  John Fitzgerald /  Anders Järryd (final)
  Sergio Casal /  Emilio Sánchez (second round)
 n/a
  Guy Forget /  Tomáš Šmíd (quarterfinals)
  Rick Leach /  Jim Pugh (third round)
  Paul Annacone /  Christo van Rensburg (second round)
  Kelly Evernden /  Johan Kriek (quarterfinals)
  Darren Cahill /  Slobodan Živojinović (second round)
  Wally Masur /  Mark Woodforde (quarterfinals)
  Marty Davis /  Brad Drewett (first round)
  Pieter Aldrich /  Danie Visser (quarterfinals)
 n/a
  Andy Kohlberg /  Robert Van't Hof (first round)
  Broderick Dyke /  Tom Nijssen (third round)
  Jeremy Bates /  Peter Lundgren (second round)

Qualifying

Draw

Finals

Top half

Section 1

Section 2

Bottom half

Section 3

Section 4

References

External links

1988 Wimbledon Championships – Men's draws and results at the International Tennis Federation

Men's Doubles
Wimbledon Championship by year – Men's doubles